This is a list of the squads of the teams that participated in the 2014 Caribbean Premier League.

Antigua Hawksbills

Barbados Tridents

Guyana Amazon Warriors

Jamaica Tallawahs

St Lucia Zouks

The Red Steel

References

External links

Caribbean Premier League